Brazil has been tackling problems of income inequality despite high rates of growth. Its GDP  growth in 2010 was 7.5%. In recent decades, there has been a decline in inequality for the country as a whole. Brazil's GINI coefficient, a measure of income inequality, has slowly decreased from 0.596 in 2001 to 0.543 in 2009. However, the numbers still point to a rather significant problem of income disparity.

The country's high income concentration is depicted by the richest one per cent of the population (less than 2 million people) having 13 percent of all household income. This percentage is similar to that of the poorest 50 per cent - about 80 million Brazilians. This inequality results in poverty levels that are inconsistent with an economy the size of that of Brazil.

Factors contributing to Brazil’s income disparity

Rural urban divide
Varying levels of economic development exists in urban and rural areas. Those living in the rural communities face a lack of proper education, healthcare and infrastructure. The lack of access to technology, formal education and skills training have resulted in fewer employment opportunities, and hence contribute to lower revenues of people living in rural areas.

Low levels of education
The low level of education in Brazil in general has been a concern as it perpetuates the income inequality situation by decreasing social mobility. This limits the opportunities of those in low income groups, lowering their chances of narrowing the income gap.  Brazil has an illiteracy rate of 10.2% and a poor quality of education. Data from the PISA program of the Organization for Economic Cooperation and Development (OECD) showed that Brazil ranks far behind other nations in terms of learning in various knowledge areas majority of their students reaching only lowest learning levels in the disciplines.

Taxation
Brazil's heavy taxes built into consumer prices include high taxes on foods, which burdens the poor. The tax load of those in the higher income brackets earning more than 30 times the minimum wage a month amounted to 26.3 per cent. In contrast, those with a monthly income of less than twice the minimum wage were taxed almost twice the amount at 48.8 per cent.

High land ownership concentration
The expansion of an export- driven agribusiness has led to land ownership concentration (IBGE census reports a GINI index of 0.872). The government implemented an agrarian reform that has resettled many family farms, which employ about 74% of agricultural workers. However, land ownership concentration was reported to be high even in areas where family farms are settled. This is a disturbing issue with regards to income inequality as family farms find it hard to compete with large-scale producers.

See also 
 Race in Brazil

References

Poverty in Brazil
Economic inequality
Brazil